The Battle of Maymyo, fought in March 1768, was the final battle and the end of the Third Qing Invasion of Burma during the Sino-Burmese War (1765–69). In November 1767, the Qianlong Emperor ordered the Third Invasion under the command of his son-in-law Mingrui with a 50,000-strong invasion force led by the Manchu Bannermen after the failure of the Green Standard Army and Yunnan Border troops in the earlier invasions. They were the most successful of the invasions penetrating deep into central Burma and defeating the main Burmese army at the Battle of Goteik Gorge. However, Mingrui ended up overstretching his lines by the time he reached Ava. Burmese reinforcements arrived from Siam and began cutting the Qing supply lines. Hounded by Burmese guerrilla attacks, his men suffering from tropical diseases and with no hope of being reinforced, Mingrui was forced to retreat. The Burmese army under Maha Thiha Thura caught up with him at Maymyo, modern day Pyinoolwin and all but wiped out the invasion force with the exception of a few survivors.

Campaign background 
The Qing army's plans were to use a pincer action on the Burmese capital of Ava with the main army of 30,000 under Ming Rui invading through Hsenwi, Lashio and Hsipaw, and down the Namtu river while the smaller one around 15,000 under General E'erdeng'e invading through Bhamo. The remaining Qing troops were left behind at Hsenwi to guard the supply lines. After defeating the main Burmese army at the Battle of Goteik Gorge, Ming Rui's forces raced to Ava mopping any resistance. However, Burmese guerrilla attacks under General Teingya Minkhaung on the long supply lines began to hamper the Qing army's ability to proceed. By the time they reached Ava, the Qing main army had overstretched itself and Ming Rui was forced on the defensive, playing for time to enable the northern army to come to his relief. However, the northern army had severely weakened itself during their repeated assaults on the Kaungton fort. Against orders, the northern force retreated back to Yunnan.

By early 1768, veteran Burmese troops had returned from the Siamese theatre and Generals Maha Thiha Thura and Ne Myo Sithu succeeded in retaking the Qing supply base at Hsenwi. Completely cut off from all supplies, the Bannermen from the freezing grasslands along the Russian border, began dying of malaria as well as guerrilla attacks in the burning weather of central Burma. Ming Rui abandoned all hope of taking Ava and attempted to retreat back to China with as many men as he could.

In March, the Qing began their retreat, stalked by a Burmese army of 10,000 men and 2000 cavalry under Maha Thiha Thura who had been promoted to overall command. The Burmese divided into two forces, a smaller army led by Maha Sithu, continued to pursue Ming Rui while the larger army led by Maha Thiha Thura advanced through the mountainous route to cut off the Qing army.

Battle 
The smaller Burmese army under Maha Sithu engaged the Qing forces head on and was repulsed by the superior Chinese numbers. However, Sithu instead of retreating pulled a number of troops, particularly archers and musketeers, into the jungle and began harassing the Qing's flanks and ambushing foraging parties. While Mingrui was occupied with Sithu's army, Thiha Thura's larger force successfully moved through the mountains to arrive directly behind the Qing army and managed to achieve complete encirclement of the Qing main army.

Over the next three days of hard fighting, the Burmese whittled away the larger but weakened and starving Chinese army. The desperate Qing troops attempted to break the encirclement through Sithu's smaller army but the Burmese infantry stood firm and held off the Chinese assaults. Trapped between Sithu's infantry in front, under arrow and musket fire from the flanks and charged by Thiha Thura's army from the rear the Qing army was eventually wiped out. Historian Harvey said that the Burmese could hardly grip their swords with their hilts so slippery with enemy blood.

Aftermath 

Aside from some 2500 men captured, the entire Qing army was completely wiped out. Mingrui was severely wounded and a small group of Qing soldiers managed to break through. Although he could have escaped, Mingrui cut off his queue and sent it to the emperor as a token of his loyalty and then hanged himself on a tree.

The Qianlong Emperor had assumed an easy victory so when then the news finally came, the Emperor was shocked. Desperate to redeem the humiliation, an even larger army invaded in 1769 under chief grand councilor Fuheng. This invasion too failed, bogged down in at frontier.

But Maha Thiha Thura, who oversaw the annihilation of Ming Rui's army at the battle of Maymyo, correctly realized that another wipe-out would merely stiffen the resolve of the Chinese government. Furthermore, Burmese losses while small compared to China were heavy in comparison to its smaller population. Taking full responsibility, Thiha Thura forced the Qing commanders to take terms without informing the king and oversaw their retreat back to Yunnan.

References 

Konbaung dynasty
Military history of Myanmar
Maymyo
Maymyo
Maymyo
Maymyo
Maymyo
Maymyo
China–Myanmar relations
18th century in China
1760s in Asia
18th century in Burma
1760s in China
1765 in China
1769 in China
1760s in Burma
1765 in Burma
Qianlong Emperor
Green Standard Army
Eight Banners
Maymyo